A tetrapod is a form of wave-dissipating concrete block used to prevent erosion caused by weather and longshore drift, primarily to enforce coastal structures such as seawalls and breakwaters. Tetrapods are made of concrete, and use a tetrahedral shape to dissipate the force of incoming waves by allowing water to flow around rather than against them, and to reduce displacement by interlocking.

Invention
Tetrapods were originally developed in 1950 by Pierre Danel and Paul Anglès d'Auriac of Laboratoire Dauphinois d'Hydraulique (now Artelia) in Grenoble, France, who received a patent for the design. The name was derived from Greek, with tetra- meaning four and -pode meaning foot, a reference to the tetrahedral shape. Tetrapods were first used at the thermal power station in Roches Noires in Casablanca, Morocco, to protect the sea water intake.

Adoption
Tetrapods have become popular across the world, particularly in Japan; it is estimated that nearly 50 percent of Japan's  coastline has been covered or somehow altered by tetrapods and other forms of concrete. Their proliferation on the island of Okinawa, a popular vacation destination in Japan, has made it difficult for tourists to find unaltered beaches and shoreline, especially in the southern half of the island.

Similar designs

The tetrapod inspired many similar concrete structures for use in breakwaters, including the Modified Cube (United States, 1959), the Stabit (United Kingdom, 1961), the Akmon (The Netherlands, 1962), the Dolos (South Africa, 1963), the Stabilopod (Romania, 1969), the Seabee (Australia, 1978), the Accropode (France, 1981), the Hollow Cube (Germany, 1991), the A-jack (United States, 1998), and the Xbloc  (The Netherlands, 2001), among others.  In Japan, the word tetrapod is often used as a generic name for wave-dissipating blocks including other types and shapes.

See also

References

Further reading
 
 
 
 
 

Coastal engineering
Wave-dissipating concrete blocks